The Seafarer 24 is an American trailerable sailboat that was designed by McCurdy & Rhodes as a cruiser and first built in 1974.

Production
The design was built by Seafarer Yachts in Huntington, New York, in the United States starting in 1974, but it is now out of production.

Boats were supplied complete and ready-to-sail, or as kits for amateur completion.

Design
The Seafarer 24 is a recreational keelboat, built predominantly of fiberglass. It has a masthead sloop rig, a raked stem and a reverse transom. There were versions with a fixed keel and a retractable centerboard.

There were two different decks available, "Standard" and "Futura", plus four different cabin layouts. The Standard deck has  of cabin headroom, while the Futura has  in the aft portion.

The design has sleeping accommodation for five people. One typical layout has a double "V"-berth in the bow cabin, a straight settee berth to starboard in the main cabin and a drop-down dinette table to port that converts to a double berth. The galley is located on the starboard side amidships and is equipped with a two-burner stove and a sink. A navigation station is opposite the galley, on the starboard side. The enclosed head is located just aft of the bow cabin on the port side.

The boat is normally fitted with a small  outboard motor for docking and maneuvering.

Variants
Seafarer 24 K
This keel-equipped model has a skeg-mounted rudder controlled by a tiller and a fixed fin keel. It displaces  and carries  of ballast. The boat has a PHRF racing average handicap of 240.
Seafarer 24 C
Marketed as the "Seafarer Sail 'n Trail 24", this centerboard model has a kick-up, transom-hung rudder controlled by a tiller. The boat has a PHRF racing average handicap of 243.

Operational history
In a 2010 review Steve Henkel wrote, "the centerboard version has virtually the same ballast and displacement as the fixed keel design, but with ballast weight centered higher up: the board has only 207 lbs. of lead, which makes her significantly more tender than the keel boat in heavy air. A Seafarer brochure mentions that this version 'has positive self-righting ability regardless of centerboard position.' Maybe so, but since 85 percent of the ballast is only a foot below the [waterline], righting moment is minimal. We'd not venture far out in heavy air."

See also
List of sailing boat types

References

External links
Photo of a Seafarer 24 with Standard deck
Photo of a Seafarer 24 with Futura deck

Keelboats
1970s sailboat type designs
Sailing yachts
Trailer sailers
Sailboat type designs by McCurdy & Rhodes
Sailboat types built by Seafarer Yachts